Charles James "Rappie" Backman (14 April 1884 – 25 April 1915) was an Australian cricketer. He played in one first-class match for South Australia in the 1911–12 Sheffield Shield season. He was killed during the Gallipoli Campaign and was the first Australian cricketer who played in the Sheffield Shield to be killed in World War I.

Family
One of the nine children of Kaspar Swanton Charles Maclean Bachman (1848-1920), and Mary Anne Backman (1853-1935), née Reid, Charles James Bachman (known as Backman), was born in Adelaide, South Australia on 14 April 1884.

One of his brothers, Edward John Backman (1890-1935), and one of his brothers-in-law, Arthur John Benton (-1917), also served in the First AIF.

Military service
Employed as a boilermaker, Backman enlisted in the First AIF on 19 August 1914, served overseas and, as a member of the 10th Australian Infantry Battalion, he took part in the landing at Anzac Cove, Gallipoli, in Turkey on Sunday, 25 April 1915.

Death
He was killed in action at Anzac Cove, Gallipoli, Ottoman Turkey, somewhere between 25 April 1915 and 29 April 1915.

See also
 List of South Australian representative cricketers
 List of cricketers who were killed during military service

Notes

References
 World War One Nominal Roll: Sergeant Charles James Backman (77), collection of the Australian War Memorial.
 World War One Embarkation Roll: Sergeant Charles James Backman (77), collection of the Australian War Memorial.
 World War One Service Record: Sergeant Charles James Backman (77), National Archives of Australia.
 Roll of Honour: Sergeant Charles James Backman (77), Australian War Memorial.
 Casualty Lists: South Australian Losses: 240th List: South Australia: Killed in Action, The (Adelaide) Chronicle, (Saturday, 11 November 1916), p.42.

External links
 

1884 births
1915 deaths
Australian cricketers
South Australia cricketers
Cricketers from Adelaide
Australian military personnel killed in World War I